Welpat Janobi is a town and union council of Bela Tehsil in the  Lasbela District of Balochistan province, Pakistan.

References

Union councils of Lasbela District
Populated places in Lasbela District